The Caroline D. Bradley Scholarship (CDB Scholarship) is a highly competitive merit-based full scholarship awarded by the Institute for Educational Advancement (IEA) for United States citizens that identifies exceptionally gifted middle school students nationwide who have demonstrated high academic potential and personal excellence and offers them a four-year scholarship to a high school that best fits their intellectual and personal needs. The scholarship pays for four years of tuition at a private high school. Students must apply while in the 7th grade. The application deadline is in April.  

Scholarship recipients must score in the top 3% on a nationally normed standardized test and take the College Board SAT college admissions test or the ACT test while in seventh grade. Applicants also write essays and finalists have an interview. Current scholars and available alumni attend an annual retreat to discuss issues of global importance and personal relevance. The scholarship was launched in 2002 with 5 students. In 2012, the college with the largest number of previous Caroline D. Bradley Scholarship winners currently enrolled as undergraduates was Harvard University. Fifteen students were selected as 2012 Caroline D. Bradley Scholars. 

The Caroline D. Bradley Scholarship is the only U.S. scholarship which pays for full tuition for high school students and that is not restricted to students who are from low-income backgrounds. The Jack Kent Cooke Foundation Young Scholars Program, awarded by Jack Kent Cooke's namesake foundation, is available to students from low-income backgrounds. These are the only two U.S. scholarships that are national competitions and that pay for high school tuition at any high school. It is possible to be awarded both scholarships.

Starting in 2019, the IEA decided to publish their annual scholarship winners as "the class of 2024" (referencing the high school graduation date) instead of "the class of 2019" (the year of receiving the scholarship).

References

Scholarships in the United States